The New York City School Construction Authority (SCA) manages the design, construction and renovation of school facilities in New York City.

The Authority is overseen by a three-member Board of Trustees appointed by the Mayor.  Two of the current SCA trustees are  Curtis A. Harris and Emily Youssouf. The third member is the  Chancellor of the New York City Department of Education, David C Banks.

History
 
The School Construction Authority was created in 1988 as a New York State public-benefit corporation by the New York State Legislature, which removed control of capital projects from the city's Board of Education in an effort to end corruption.

See also
 New York City Department of Education

References

External links
 New York City School Construction Authority

Public benefit corporations in New York (state)
Public education in New York City